"Peru" is a song by Nigerian singer Fireboy DML. It was released on 20 July 2021, through YBNL Nation, and distributed by Empire. "Peru" was written by Fireboy DML, Ivory Scott, & Kolten Perine and produced by Shizzi & Perine. On 23 December 2021, a reworked version of "Peru" was released, in collaboration with English singer-songwriter Ed Sheeran. The music video for the version with Sheeran was released on 24 December 2021. An additional remix, featuring rappers 21 Savage and Blxst was also later released. The song was nominated at the 7th annual African Entertainment Awards USA for Song of the Year. The song is not about the country of Peru, but rather a reference to  Nigerian singer Peruzzi; the government of Peru nonetheless reacted positively to the song on Twitter.

Background
After the song garnered popularity and reached number one on the UK Afrobeats Singles Chart, Fireboy reached out to Sheeran for a remix through the founder of SB.TV, Jamal Edwards. On 11 February 2022, he released the official remix of "Peru", with featured vocals from 21 Savage and Blxst, through Empire Distribution for YBNL Nation.

Music video
On 6 August 2021, Fireboy released the music video for "Peru". The visual sees Fireboy lounging around the streets of the US, seen in the studio, skydiving and trying out dishes. The visual was directed by Mariano Valentino, with additional footage shot by Dakota Lim, and Diego Pina. The visual was edited by Ryan Corr. The new version, music video featuring Ed Sheeran, was released on 24 December 2021. Directed by Gabriella Kingsley, and shot in London, United Kingdom. The music video reached 1.9 million views, less than 24 hours after its releases. On 21 December 2021, Fireboy shared a short clip on his social platforms, singing "Peru" with Sheeran.

Accolades

Commercial performance    
"Peru" peaked at number two on the UK Singles Chart, and number one on UK Afrobeats Singles Chart. It would eventually spend 22 consecutive weeks in the top 10, tying "Shape of You" and "Bad Habits" as Sheeran's longest-charting songs in the top 10. On 2 August, it debuted at number ten on the TurnTable Top 50. On 4 August, the song peaked at number 14 on the TurnTable Top 50 Airplay chart. On the same day, it peaked at number five on TurnTable Top 50 streaming songs chart. On 26 August, "Peru" peaked at number 26 on TurnTable TV Top songs chart. On 2 December 2021, it was named on Apple Music Top Songs of 2021, in Nigeria. "Peru" is Fireboy's most popular record with over 20.6 million Spotify streams as of December 2021.

Track listing
Digital download and streaming
"Peru" – 2:31

Digital download, streaming and CD single
"Peru" (with Ed Sheeran) – 3:07

Digital download and streaming
"Peru" (Acoustic) (with Ed Sheeran) – 2:52

Digital download and streaming
"Peru" (Remix) (with 21 Savage and Blxst) – 3:06

Digital download and streaming
"Peru" (R3hab Remix) (with Ed Sheeran) – 2:29

Charts

Weekly charts

Year-end charts

Certifications

Release history

References

External links
 
 
 

2021 singles
2021 songs
Pop songs
Fireboy DML songs
Empire Distribution singles
YBNL Nation singles
Song recordings produced by Shizzi